Superfly is a 2018 American action crime thriller film and a remake of the 1972 blaxploitation film Super Fly. The film was directed by Director X, written by Alex Tse and stars Trevor Jackson, Jason Mitchell, Michael K. Williams, Lex Scott Davis, and Jennifer Morrison. Rapper Future produced alongside Joel Silver, as well as writing the film's original songs.

Superfly was released in the United States on June 13, 2018 and received mixed reviews from critics, who praised the movie's style but ultimately found a lack of substance.

Plot

Youngblood Priest is a young cocaine kingpin from Atlanta, Georgia, working the streets since he was brought in by his mentor Scatter at age eleven. He lives with his two girlfriends, Georgia and Cynthia.

Juju, a member of rival gang Snow Patrol, hits on Cynthia and, shooting at Priest, accidentally hits a bystander. The Snow Patrol members leave while Priest gives the victim money and directs them to the trauma center.

Priest confides in his second-in-command Eddie that he wants out of drug-dealing, and has a plan. Eddie has his back but Scatter refuses to help. Juju suspects Priest of a hit on Snow Patrol and plans to retaliate. Snow Patrol deduces that Priest's colleague, Fat Freddie, was one of the assailants.

Fat Freddie is pulled over by corrupt cops Franklin and Mason. They discover cocaine and find Eddie in Freddie's contacts. With Mason's gun at Freddie's head, Freddie's girlfriend reveals his criminal history and Priest's identity. Franklin kills Freddie and Rochelle.

Mason threatens to expose Priest's dealing if he does not work with her. Fighting over recriminations about Freddie's death, Priest starts strangling Eddie and leaves him unconscious. Scatter surprises Priest at Freddie's funeral, ordering him to meet with his supplier Adalberto, after finding out Priest cut a secret deal for more product. Adalberto kills Scatter, having realized he was stealing from him. Adalberto threatens Priest, telling him that he can never get out of the game.

Snow Patrol members led by Juju shoot up Priest's mansion. Cynthia is killed, and Priest and Georgia set fire to the mansion. Chasing Priest, Juju is injured and Q is killed in a car crash. Eddie feigns allegiance with Snow Patrol, and tricks them into an ambush where they are killed by Mason and other cops alerted by Priest.

Priest thanks Eddie for his help and prepares to leave the country with Georgia. He blackmails the mayor with a sex tape and promises the mayor will win the upcoming election. Adalberto is disowned by his mother, and executed at her order after she receives proof that he framed his brother for a crime. Instead of paying off Mason, Priest tips off police and she is arrested for cocaine possession.

Priest meets Franklin and beats him to avenge Freddie's murder. Having settled his business obligations, and with his enemies either dead or in custody, Priest and Georgia relax on a cruise in Montenegro.

Cast
 Trevor Jackson as Youngblood Priest, an Atlanta drug lord, who sees an opportunity to leave the game before he gets killed.
 Jason Mitchell as Eddie, Priest's right-hand-man. He always has his best friend's back, even to the point of risking his life to help him exit the drug game.
 Michael K. Williams as Scatter, Priest's mentor and an experienced dealer. He took Priest under his wing when the latter was younger.
 Lex Scott Davis as Georgia, Priest's girlfriend. She has a strong affection and loyalty for him.
 Jennifer Morrison as Detective Mason, a corrupt cop who blackmails Priest with evidence of his dealing.
Kaalan "KR" Walker as Juju, a member of the Snow Patrol, a rival drug outfit, who takes an immediate dislike to Priest and plots to kill him.
Esai Morales as Adalberto Gonzalez, the leader of a Mexican drug cartel who does business with Scatter and Priest.
Andrea Londo as Cynthia, Priest's other girlfriend. A professional stripper, she has more of a casual affection towards her lover but ultimately dies trying to protect him from Snow Patrol.
Big Bank Black as Q, the pragmatic leader of Snow Patrol. Killed while trying to hunt down Priest.
Antwan “Big Boi” Patton as Mayor Wendell Atkins, who Priest blackmails for help leaving the game.
Jacob Ming-Trent as Frederick "Fat Freddie" Davis, one of Priest's oldest colleagues. He is murdered after being forced to reveal information about Priest to Mason.
Brian F. Durkin as Officer Turk Franklin

Production
Production began in December 2017, with Future announcing the project and confirming Director X as director. Principal photography started in Atlanta, Georgia in January 2018. Filming wrapped in March 2018, a process that Deadline Hollywood called an "unprecedented turnaround".

While Sony and other publications reported the film was made on a net production budget of $16 million, Deadline stated their sources insisted the actual cost was "well north of $20 [million], near $30 [million]". The site compared the situation to Proud Mary, a film released in January 2018 that Sony reported cost $14 million to make but other sources listed at as high as $30 million.

Soundtrack

The soundtrack for the film was curated by American rapper Future, who also acted as a producer on the film. It features 13 new and previously released songs, as well as guest appearances from Miguel, Lil Wayne, Khalid, Ty Dolla Sign, Young Thug, PartyNextDoor, H.E.R., Gunna, Sleepy Brown, and Yung Bans, among others.

Release 
Superfly was initially scheduled to be released on June 15, 2018. Three weeks prior, it was moved up two days to June 13, 2018, in order to avoid direct competition with Incredibles 2.

The film was released on digital and iTunes on August 28, 2018 from Sony Pictures Home Entertainment. It was released on Blu-Ray and DVD on 11 September 2018.

Reception

Box office
In the United States and Canada, Superfly was projected to gross $7–12 million from 2,200 theaters over its five-day opening weekend. The film made $1.2 million on its first day, $938,583 on its second and $1.8 million on its third. It ended up grossing $6.9 million in its opening weekend (a five-day total of $9 million), finishing sixth at the box office. It dropped to $3.4 million in its second weekend, finishing eighth, and after being pulled from 1,064 theaters in its third week made $1.3 million, finishing 12th.

Critical response
The website's critical consensus reads, "Superfly updates the blaxploitation original with a stylish remake that's exciting and visually arresting enough to offer its own slickly staged action rewards, but disappointingly short on social subtext." On Metacritic, which assigns a normalized rating to reviews, the film has a weighted average score of 52 out of 100, based on 30 critics, indicating "mixed or average reviews". Audiences polled by CinemaScore gave the film an average grade of "B+" on an A+ to F scale, while PostTrak reported filmgoers gave it a 68% overall positive score.

Varietys Owen Gleiberman wrote: "Shot in a functional, slammed-together manner that's less sensually stylish than you'd expect from a music-video auteur, the film is a competent yet glossy and hermetic street-hustle drug thriller, less a new urban myth than a lavishly concocted episode. It holds your attention yet leaves you with nothing."

See also
List of black films of the 2010s

References

External links 
 
 

2018 films
2018 action drama films
2018 crime action films
2018 crime drama films
Remakes of American films
American crime drama films
Columbia Pictures films
Blaxploitation films
Silver Pictures films
Fictional portrayals of the Atlanta Police Department
Films about cocaine
Films about the illegal drug trade
Films directed by Director X
Films produced by Joel Silver
Films set in Atlanta
Films set in Montenegro
Films shot in Atlanta
2010s English-language films
2010s American films